Sione Katoa (born 21 August 1997) is a Tonga international rugby league footballer who plays on the  for the Cronulla-Sutherland Sharks in the NRL.

Background
Katoa was born in Hamilton, New Zealand and is of Tongan descent. Katoa moved to Sydney, Australia in 2003 aged 6.

He played his junior rugby league for the Chester Hill Hornets. 

Katoa was part of the Parramatta Eels junior systems before being signed by the Cronulla-Sutherland Sharks. 

Katoa played for the Cronulla-Sutherland Sharks NYC team in 2016-2017, scoring 44 tries in 49 matches. On 4 September 2017, Katoa was named on the wing in the 2017 Holden Cup Team of the Year.

Playing career

2018
After impressing in the pre-season trials for the Sharks, Katoa had beaten the likes of Edrick Lee and Aaron Gray to the vacant wing spot for Round 1. In Round 1 of the 2018 NRL season, Katoa made his NRL debut for the Cronulla-Sutherland Sharks against the North Queensland Cowboys, starting on the wing and had a solid performance before leaving the field with a suspected broken jaw in the second-half as the Sharks were defeated 20-14 at 1300SMILES Stadium.

Katoa ended the season playing for Cronulla's feeder club side Newtown in the Intrust Super Premiership NSW.  Katoa played on the wing for Newtown in their 2018 Intrust Super Premiership NSW grand final loss to Canterbury-Bankstown at Leichhardt Oval.

2019
Katoa made 7 appearances for Cronulla-Sutherland in the 2019 NRL season but mainly spent much of the year playing for the club's feeder side Newtown in the Canterbury Cup NSW.  Katoa played for Newtown in their 2019 Canterbury Cup NSW grand final victory over the Wentworthville Magpies at the new Western Sydney Stadium.  The following week, Katoa played for Newtown in the NRL State Championship victory over the Burleigh Bears at ANZ Stadium.

2020
In round 6 of the 2020 NRL season, Katoa scored a hat-trick as Cronulla defeated Canterbury 20-18 at Bankwest Stadium.

2021
In round 19 of the 2021 NRL season, he scored two tries for Cronulla in a 44-24 victory over Canterbury-Bankstown.

In round 23 against the Wests Tigers, Katoa scored two tries for Cronulla in a 50-20 victory.  In round 25, Katoa scored two tries for Cronulla in a 26-18 loss against Melbourne.
He played 13 games for Cronulla and scored nine tries in the 2021 NRL season which saw the club narrowly miss the finals by finishing 9th on the table.

2022
In round 14 of the 2022 NRL season, Katoa scored a hat-trick in Cronulla's 38-16 victory over the New Zealand Warriors.
On 19 July, Katoa was ruled out for the rest of the 2022 NRL season with a pectoral injury.

Statistics

NRL
 Statistics are correct as of the end of the 2022 season

International

References

External links
Cronulla-Sutherland Sharks profile

1997 births
Living people
Cronulla-Sutherland Sharks players
New Zealand rugby league players
New Zealand sportspeople of Tongan descent
Newtown Jets NSW Cup players
Rugby league players from Hamilton, New Zealand
Rugby league wingers
Tonga national rugby league team players